Aquae Saravenae was a town of ancient Cappadocia, inhabited during Byzantine times. The Battle of Pankaleia was fought at or near the town.

Its site is located near Kırşehir, Asiatic Turkey.

References

Populated places in ancient Cappadocia
Former populated places in Turkey
Populated places of the Byzantine Empire
History of Niğde Province